Malcolm A. E. "Mal" Spence (2 January 1936 – 30 October 2017) was a Jamaican athlete who mainly competed in the 400 metres. His twin brother Melville also competed in track and field.  Malcolm died five years and two days after his brother.

Spence competed for the British West Indies in the 1960 Summer Olympics held in Rome, Italy, where he won the bronze medal in the men's 4x400 metres relay with his teammates James Wedderburn, Keith Gardner and George Kerr.  Curiously, there were two people named Malcolm Spence running the 400 meters distance at both the 1956 and the 1960 Olympics, both getting a bronze medal in 1960.  Malcolm Spence from South Africa took the bronze medal in the Open race, while the South African relay team finished in fourth, one second behind Mal Spence's British West Indian relay team.  Both twins returned to run the 4x400 relay in 1964 as members of the first independent Jamaican team.

Living in Florida, he served as a torchbearer for the 1996 Olympics in nearby Atlanta.

Both Mal and his twin brother were recruited to run for Arizona State University during the civil rights movement of the late 1950s, among the first international athletes to come to the USA for athletics.

He is the author of The Lives and Times of Mal and Mel: Three Times Jamaican Olympians published in 2011.

References

 
 

1936 births
2017 deaths
Jamaican male sprinters
Twin sportspeople
Olympic bronze medalists for the British West Indies
Athletes (track and field) at the 1956 Summer Olympics
Athletes (track and field) at the 1958 British Empire and Commonwealth Games
Athletes (track and field) at the 1959 Pan American Games
Athletes (track and field) at the 1960 Summer Olympics
Athletes (track and field) at the 1962 British Empire and Commonwealth Games
Athletes (track and field) at the 1963 Pan American Games
Athletes (track and field) at the 1964 Summer Olympics
Athletes (track and field) at the 1966 British Empire and Commonwealth Games
Olympic athletes of Jamaica
Olympic athletes of the British West Indies
Commonwealth Games medallists in athletics
Pan American Games gold medalists for the British West Indies
Pan American Games bronze medalists for the British West Indies
Pan American Games medalists in athletics (track and field)
Jamaican twins
Medalists at the 1960 Summer Olympics
Olympic bronze medalists in athletics (track and field)
Commonwealth Games gold medallists for Jamaica
Commonwealth Games bronze medallists for Jamaica
Central American and Caribbean Games bronze medalists for Jamaica
Competitors at the 1962 Central American and Caribbean Games
Central American and Caribbean Games gold medalists for Jamaica
Central American and Caribbean Games medalists in athletics
Medalists at the 1959 Pan American Games
Medalists at the 1963 Pan American Games
Medallists at the 1958 British Empire and Commonwealth Games
Medallists at the 1962 British Empire and Commonwealth Games